The Lincs FM Group was the parent company of several Independent Local Radio (ILR) stations. As of Q2 2019 the group had a combined audience of 524,000. It was based in Lincolnshire, in the UK.

History
The Lincs FM Group was formed in the early 1990s with the winning of the ILR licence for Lincolnshire. Lincs FM started broadcasting in 1992 and since then the Lincs FM Group has won and acquired licences to operate other local radio stations across the UK's Midlands and Yorkshire regions.

The Lincs FM Group also had a 33% share in Ipswich 102 and a 51% share in the digital radio multiplexes operating DAB services in Lincolnshire and Suffolk.

Lincs FM Group was purchased by Bauer Radio in February 2019; Bauer also purchased the stations of Celador Radio at the same time. KCFM was sold to Nation Broadcasting due to overlapping with existing Bauer asset Viking FM; the other Lincs stations remained with Bauer. Due to further potential competition issues with Bauer's existing stations and their new purchases the group has been operating in 'hold separate' pending investigation of the sale by the Competition and Markets Authority.

After acquisition, most of the group's remaining stations were rebranded as Greatest Hits Radio with Suffolk First closing, and Lincs FM retained as a standalone station.

Radio Stations 

 Lincs FM (Lincolnshire & Newark)
 Compass FM (North East Lincolnshire)
 Trax FM (Doncaster & Bassetlaw)
 Dearne FM (Barnsley, Penistone and the Dearne Valley)
 Rutland Radio (Stamford & Rutland)
 Ridings FM (the Wakefield district)
 Rother FM (Rotherham)
 Suffolk First (Suffolk)

Branding
Each station's logo was green and purple as these are the company colours; these logos feature heavily in each stations merchandise.

The group ran three music formats across its stations. "Hits & Memories" stations were the staple of the group, playing a wide variety of popular music from the 1960s to the present day. "Music You Love" stations leant older, with a greater percentage of songs released pre-1990 played. "Country music and more" was the format of the digital-only station Suffolk First, which played a mixture of country music and pop music.

Hits & Memories Brand
Lincs FM for Lincolnshire and Newark
 Dearne FM for Barnsley, Penistone and the Dearne Valley
 Rother FM for Rotherham and the surrounding area
 Trax FM for Doncaster, Bassetlaw and Worksop (2 licences)
 Rutland Radio for Rutland and Stamford
The Music You Love Brand
Compass FM for Grimsby, Cleethorpes and Immingham
Ridings FM for the Wakefield district

Acquisitions
Until October 2007 the group was unique in the United Kingdom in that it had grown organically through licence awards, rather than by acquisition of existing stations.  As FM licences ceased advertising in the late 2000s, the group, with a desire to continue growing, made their first acquisition with Oak 107 FM in October 2007 (previously owned by the CN Group). This station was sold on a few years later to rejoin its former network. This was followed by the acquisition of KCFM in June 2009, previously owned by Planet Broadcasting.

Disposals
 Oak FM, comprising the Hinckley and Loughborough licences, was sold to Quidem in 2012.  It was rebranded as Fosse 107 following the insolvency of the station

 KCFM was sold to Nation Broadcasting in February 2019

Licence bid failure
In 2006, the group made a bid to win the Hull licence along with six other groups. The format for the Lincs bid was the same of that of Compass FM; this is thought to be because Lincs FM already overlaps the North East Lincolnshire area. The station went under the working title of "White Rose Radio" to reflect the white rose of Yorkshire. The group did not win the licence and lost out to Kingston upon Hull-based KCFM. However, KCFM became part of the Lincs FM Group in June 2009.

See also
 List of companies in Lincolnshire

References

External links
 lincsfmgroup.co.uk - Group website.

Radio broadcasting companies of the United Kingdom
Companies based in Lincoln, England
Mass media in Lincolnshire
Lincoln, England
Mass media companies established in 1991
1991 establishments in England
2019 mergers and acquisitions
Mass media companies disestablished in 2019
2019 disestablishments in England